HycI peptidase (HycI, HycE processing protein) is an enzyme. This enzyme catalyses the following chemical reaction

 This enzyme specifically removes a 32-amino acid peptide from the C-terminus of the precursor of the large subunit of hydrogenase 3 in Escherichia coli by cleavage at the C-terminal side of Arg537.

This enzyme belongs to the peptidase family A31.

References

External links 
 

EC 3.4.23